National Cyber Security Centre, National Cyber Security Center, or National Cybersecurity Center may refer to:

Americas
 Cybersecurity and Infrastructure Security Agency, United States
 Canadian Centre for Cyber Security, Canada

Asia

 Cyber Security Agency (Singapore)
 Indian Computer Emergency Response Team, India 
 National Electronic Security Authority, UAE

Europe

 Agence nationale de la sécurité des systèmes d'information, France
 Estonian Defence League's Cyber Unit
 European Cybercrime Centre (EC3), European Union
 National Cyberdefence Centre, Germany
 National Cyber Security Centre (Ireland)
 National Cyber Security Centre of Lithuania
 National Cyber Security Centre (United Kingdom)

Oceania
Australian Cyber Security Centre
National Cyber Security Centre (New Zealand)

See also
Cooperative Cyber Defence Centre of Excellence, Tallinn, Estonia
National Intelligence Service (South Korea), oversees cyber security in South Korea